Rose River may refer to:

 Rose River (Victoria), a river in the state of Victoria, Australia
 Rose River (Arnhem Land), a river in the Northern Territory, Australia
 Rose River (Virginia), a river in the state of Virginia, in the United States of America

See also
 Teton River (Montana), also called the Rose River
 Ross River (disambiguation)